The FIBA EuroBasket Top Scorer is the FIBA Europe honor that is bestowed upon the leading scorer of each FIBA EuroBasket tournament. Radivoj Korać and Nikos Galis hold the scoring king record, finishing as the EuroBasket's top scorer on four occasions.

Key

Top scorers

Most frequent top scorers 

All information as of end EuroBasket 2022

See also 
 FIBA EuroBasket
 FIBA EuroBasket MVP
 FIBA EuroBasket All-Tournament Team
 FIBA EuroBasket All-Time leaders in games played
 FIBA EuroBasket All-time leading scorers in total points scored
 FIBA World Cup
 FIBA World Cup Records
 FIBA Basketball World Cup Most Valuable Player
 FIBA Basketball World Cup All-Tournament Team
 FIBA's 50 Greatest Players (1991)

References

External links 
 
 

top scorer
European basketball awards